Leone Caetani (September 12, 1869 – December 25, 1935), Duke of Sermoneta (also known as Prince Caetani), was an Italian scholar, politician, and historian of the Middle East.

Caetani is considered a pioneer in the application of the historical method to sources of the early Islamic traditions, which he subjected to minute historical and psychological analysis.

He was the father of Italian-Canadian visual artist Sveva Caetani.

Life 

Caetani was born in Rome into the prominent and wealthy Caetani family. His father Onorato Caetani, Prince of Teano and Duke of Sermoneta, was Italian Minister of Foreign Affairs in 1896 in the second di Rudini cabinet; his English mother, Ada Bootle Wilbraham, was the daughter of the Earl of Lathom. His paternal grandfather, Michelangelo, had married the Polish Countess Calixta Rzewuski, whose ancestor Wacław Seweryn Rzewuski had been a well-known Polish orientalist.

Caetani developed an interest in foreign languages at an early age. At 15, he began to study Sanskrit and Arabic on his own. Later he studied Oriental languages at the University of Rome, under Ignazio Guidi and Giacomo Lignana, with an intensive study of Arabic, Hebrew, Persian, Sanskrit and Syriac languages (and perhaps also Turkish).
Caetani spent many years researching and traveling throughout the Muslim world, gathering material on a wide range of Islamic cultures from Tunisia, Algeria, Egypt, Syria, Turkey, Iraq, the Levant, the Sahara, India, Central Asia, and southern Russia. Later, one of his disciples was Giorgio Levi Della Vida.
He became a corresponding member of the Accademia Nazionale dei Lincei in 1911 and a full member in 1919. Later, he left his rich library to the Lincei to create the Caetani foundation for Muslim studies.

Caetani also served as a deputy of the Italian Parliament (1909–1913), keeping a radical socialist stance.
He married Vittoria Colonna Caetani of the Colonna, daughter of Marcantonio VI prince of Paliano, from whom he later separated; in 1917 he succeeded his father as Prince of Teano and Duke of Sermoneta.

After the end of his marriage and the rise of Fascism, in 1927 Caetani decided to emigrate to Vernon, British Columbia, Canada, with his new partner Ofelia Fabiani and their daughter Sveva. He later became a Canadian citizen. In 1935, the Fascist regime stripped him of his Italian citizenship and expelled him from the Accademia dei Lincei; he died soon afterwards in the same year in Vancouver, British Columbia.

Research 

Caetani made extensive analysis of sources related to the origins of the Qur'an and Islamic thought between 1904 and 1926 during which he collected and arranged chronologically all known materials related to the origins of Islam. Caetani presented his critical analysis and conclusions regarding what he believed to be inconsistencies, contradictions, and variances in the Islamic sources in his ten-volume work Annali dell'Islam.

Caetani claimed that most of the early traditions of Islam could be dismissed as fabrications by later generations of authors. He also suggested that the Arab conquests during the formative era of Islam were driven not by religion but by material want and covetousness.

References

Works
 Annali dell' Islam (Milan, Ulrico Hoepli, 1905–1907), 10 volumes
 "Uthman and the Recension of the Koran", Muslim World 5 (1915), pp. 380–90
 Study of the history of the Orient (Milan, Ulrico Hoepli, 1914)

External links

Caetani, Leone in Dizionario Biografico degli Italiani – Volume 16 (1973)
Fondazione Caetani per gli studi musulmani presso l'Accademia dei Lincei
https://web.archive.org/web/20050930010903/http://www.iant.com/imam/methodol.txt

The Caetani Family: Popes, Princes, Scholars and Artists :: Greater Vernon Museum & Archives at www.vernonmuseum.ca
The Caetani family: The Caetani Family: Popes, Princes, Scholars and Artists

1869 births
1935 deaths
Politicians from Rome
Italian Arabists
Italian emigrants to Canada
Italian orientalists
Scholars of Islam
Scholars of medieval Islamic history
Members of the Lincean Academy
Deaths from cancer in British Columbia